Doug Hammond (born December 26, 1942) is an American free funk/avant-garde jazz drummer, composer, poet, producer, and professor. His first major release was Reflections in the Sea of Nurnen on Tribe Records in 1975.

Career 
He has worked with musicians including Earl Hooker, Sonny Rollins, Charles Mingus, Sammy Price, Donald Byrd, Wolfgang Dauner, Ornette Coleman, Steve Coleman, Nina Simone, Betty Carter, Marion Williams, Paquito D'Rivera, Arnett Cobb, James Blood Ulmer and Arthur Blythe.

In 2010 Doug Hammond wrote and conducted "Acknowledgement Suite" with Dwight Adams, Jean Toussaint, Roman Filiú, Howard Curtis, Wendell Harrison, Dick Griffin, Stéphane Payen, Kirk Lightsey and Arron James.

He was a professor at the Anton Bruckner Private University in Linz.

His work has been filmed in a documentary Sparkle of Inspiration by the Austrian director Dieter Strauch released during the Crossing Europe Film Festival in Linz in 2016.

Personal life 
He lives and works in Linz, Austria.

Discography

 Reflections in the Sea of Nurnen with David Durrah (Tribe, 1975; Pony Canyon, 2004)
 Ellipse with Karen Joseph (Idibib, 1976)
 Folks (Idibib, 1980)
 Alone (Scarecrow, 1982)
 Spaces (Idibib, 1982; Rebel-X/DIW, 1992) with Steve Coleman among others
 and Mo' Folks: We People (Idibib, 1989) with Regina Carter among others
 Perspiciuty (L+R, 1991) Trio with Steve Coleman
 It's Born (JPC, 1996)
 Singing Smiles (Idibib, 2005)
 A Real Deal (Heavenly Sweetness, 2007)
 It's Now (Idibib, 2010)
 New Beginning (Blue Marge, 2010)
With Charles Mingus
Mingus Moves (Atlantic, 1973)
With Lonnie Liston Smith
Cosmic Funk (Flying Dutchman, 1974)

References

External links
 Doug Hammond at Allaboutjazz
 Doug Hammond interview at opus-x.de
 Doug Hammond Tentet Project interviews at Allaboutjazz.com
 Doug Hammond - "An AmeriEuro Fantasia" at Allaboutjazz.com

1942 births
Living people
Avant-garde jazz drummers
American jazz drummers
20th-century American drummers
American male drummers
20th-century American male musicians
American male jazz musicians
Academic staff of Anton Bruckner Private University